Eric Mitchell (born August 25, 1969) is an American former professional boxer who competed from 1993 to 2015.

In 2001, he defeated to former world title challenger Ross Thompson for the North American Boxing Association middleweight title.

In 2003, he lost to future world champion Alejandro Berrio.

In 2008, Mitchell lost to Danny Perez Ramírez for the United States Boxing Association and the North American Boxing Organization middleweight titles.

In 2009, he lost to former world champion Joachim Alcine.

In 2010, he lost to Dmitry Pirog for the World Boxing Organization (WBO) Asia Pacific middleweight title.

In 2012, Mitchell lost to Elvin Ayala for the World Boxing Council USNBC middleweight title.

In 2014, he fought to a draw against former world title challenger Harry Joe Yorgey.

In 2015, Mitchell lost to Jarrett Hurd.

References

External links
 

1969 births
Living people
American male boxers
Middleweight boxers